La Dance may refer to:
 "La Dance", a song by Paps 'n' Skar
 "La Dance", a song by Gigi D'Agostino from L'Amour Toujours

See also 
 Jean la Dance, a character in the 1945 film Zombies on Broadway
 La Danse (disambiguation)
 Dance (disambiguation)
 The Dance (disambiguation)